Gilles Grimandi (born 11 November 1970) is a French former professional footballer who played as a centre back or midfielder.

In his playing career, he went from hometown team Gap to top-flight Monaco before arriving at Arsenal of the Premier League in 1997. He won two league-and-cup doubles with them before leaving in 2002.

Playing career 
Born in Gap, Hautes-Alpes, France Grimandi began his professional career with Monaco in 1990 and made his first-team debut in 1991 against AS Nancy in Division 1. His career briefly interrupted by French military service, he went on to make 67 appearances and score three goals for the club, mostly as a centre back. He helped the club reach both a UEFA Champions League and a UEFA Cup semifinal, and won the league title in 1996–97.

The following season, Grimandi left to join his former manager Arsène Wenger at Arsenal, making his debut at Elland Road against Leeds United, and helped achieve The Double in his first season. He made 113 league appearances as a midfielder, centre back, and right wingback, winning a second Double in his final season (2001–02) with the club.

Grimandi signed with the Colorado Rapids of Major League Soccer on 8 January 2003, after turning down an offer from Middlesbrough. Grimandi was the first Frenchman to sign for MLS, and played a pre-season friendly against Santos Laguna of Mexico on 12 March. On 30 April he quit the club for family reasons to return to France. The Rapids' management described themselves as "deeply saddened" by his decision.

Post-playing career 
Grimandi has remained active in the sport, taking his first administrative position in 2004 as football director at ASOA Valence. Valence were playing in the Championnats National, the French third division at the time of his appointment. Grimandi became a French-based scout for Arsenal in 2006. He also took part in Dennis Bergkamp's testimonial game at Arsenal's new Emirates Stadium in July of that year, making a controversial tackle on Edgar Davids as the Dutchman looked to tap into an empty net to open the scoring for Ajax.

Grimandi was linked with a director of football position at Arsenal in July 2007, in charge of acquiring new players. However, no appointment to the role was made. 

In March 2019, Grimandi left his position at Arsenal to become technical director at OGC Nice, joining forces with former teammate Patrick Vieira. Grimandi resigned by mutual agreement on 7 October 2019.

Grimandi now runs a wine yard in Banbury.

Honours
Monaco
Division 1: 1996–97

Arsenal
Premier League: 1997–98, 2001–02
FA Cup: 1997–98; runner-up: 2000–01
FA Charity Shield: 1998, 1999
UEFA Cup runner-up: 1999–2000

References

External links 

 
 

1970 births
Living people
People from Gap, Hautes-Alpes
Sportspeople from Hautes-Alpes
Association football defenders
Association football midfielders
French footballers
AS Monaco FC players
Arsenal F.C. players
Colorado Rapids players
Ligue 1 players
Premier League players
French expatriate footballers
Expatriate footballers in England
Expatriate soccer players in the United States
French expatriate sportspeople in England
French expatriate sportspeople in the United States
Arsenal F.C. non-playing staff
FA Cup Final players
Footballers from Provence-Alpes-Côte d'Azur